Paul Adrian Racey is the Regius Professor of Natural History emeritus at the University of Aberdeen. He retired 2009 to leave the chair unoccupied for five years when Christopher John Secombes succeeded him. He is a leading authority on bats. The species Pipistrellus raceyi was named after him.

References

External links 
https://www.researchgate.net/profile/Paul_Racey

Living people
Academics of the University of Aberdeen
Bats
Alumni of the University of Aberdeen
Alumni of the University of London
Alumni of the University of Cambridge
British zoologists
British mammalogists
Year of birth missing (living people)